Dreams have been credited as the inspiration for several creative works and scientific discoveries.

Books and poetry

Kubla Khan
Samuel Taylor Coleridge wrote Kubla Khan (completed in 1797 and published in 1816) upon awakening from an opium-influenced dream. In a preface to the work, he described having the poem come to him, fully formed, in his dream. When he woke, he immediately set to writing it down, but was interrupted by a visitor and could not remember the final lines. For this reason, he kept it unpublished for many years.

Frankenstein
Mary Shelley's Frankenstein (1818) was inspired by a dream:

Strange Case of Dr Jekyll and Mr Hyde
Robert Louis Stevenson dreamed the plot for his famous novel Strange Case of Dr Jekyll and Mr Hyde (1886).

Tintin in Tibet
The Belgian comics artist Hergé was plagued by nightmares in which he was chased by a white skeleton, whereupon the entire environment turned white. A psychiatrist advised him to stop making comics and take a rest, but Hergé drew an entire story set in a white environment: the snowy mountaintops of Tibet. Tintin in Tibet (1960) not only stopped his nightmares and worked as a therapeutic experience, but the work is also regarded as one of his masterpieces.

Twilight
Inspiration for Stephenie Meyer's Twilight (2005) came by a dream:

The Miraculous Journey of Edward Tulane 
The seeds to the plot of The Miraculous Journey of Edward Tulane (2006) came to Kate DiCamillo in a dream: "One Christmas, I received an elegantly dressed toy rabbit as a gift.  A few days later, I dreamed that the rabbit was face down on the ocean floor - lost and waiting to be found."

Music

Devil's Trill Sonata 

Giuseppe Tartini recounted that his most famous work, his Violin Sonata in G minor, more commonly known as the Devil's Trill Sonata, came to him in a dream in 1713. According to Tartini's account given to the French astronomer Jérôme Lalande, he dreamed that he had made a pact with the devil, to whom he had handed a violin after a music lesson, in order to assess whether the devil could play. The devil then proceeded to play "with such great art and intelligence, as I had never even conceived in my boldest flights of fantasy".

Tartini said that on waking he "immediately grasped my violin in order to retain, in part at least, the impression of my dream".

"(I Can't Get No) Satisfaction"
Keith Richards claimed to have dreamed the riff to the 1965 song "(I Can't Get No) Satisfaction". He ran through it once before falling asleep. He said when he listened back to it in the morning, there was about two minutes of acoustic guitar before you could hear him drop the pick and "then me snoring for the next forty minutes".

"Yesterday"
Paul McCartney claimed to have dreamed the melody to his song "Yesterday" (1965). After he woke up, he thought it was just a vague memory of some song he heard when he was younger. As it turned out that he had completely thought up this song all by himself, he recorded it and it became the most often covered pop song in the world.

"Let It Be"
Paul McCartney has also claimed that the idea of "Let It Be" came to him after a dream he had about his mother during the tense period surrounding the sessions for The Beatles ("the White Album") in 1968. McCartney later said: "It was great to visit with her again. I felt very blessed to have that dream. So that got me writing 'Let It Be'." In a later interview, McCartney said that in the dream his mother had told him, "It will be all right, just let it be."

"The Prophet's Song" 
Brian May said that he was inspired to write the 1975 Queen track "The Prophet's Song" after a hepatitis-induced fever dream he had about an apocalyptic flood. It is the longest Queen song with vocals.

Selected Ambient Works Volume II 

Richard James, who performs as Aphex Twin, has written several ambient tracks while lucid dreaming, saying that:

James says that seventy per cent of his 1994 album Selected Ambient Works Volume II was written while lucid dreaming.

The Dark Carnival
Violent J, a member of Insane Clown Posse, claimed to have dreamed the concept of The Dark Carnival, which is described in much of their discography. The concept was inspired by a dream of Insane Clown Posse member Violent J where spirits in a traveling carnival appeared to him.

Film and television

3 Women 
Director Robert Altman conceived of his 1977 film 3 Women during a restless sleep while his wife was in the hospital. He dreamt that he was directing a film starring Shelley Duvall and Sissy Spacek in an identity theft story, against a desert backdrop. He based the film on this dream, although additional story details were added later.

The Terminator

Director James Cameron said the titular character in The Terminator (1984) was inspired by a dream he had under the influence of a soaring fever. It was a vivid dream where a gleaming figure of doom emerged from fire; a metallic, skeletal monster with a rictus smile and burning red eyes, dragging itself across the floor with kitchen knives. He states: "I was sick and dead broke in Rome, Italy, with a fever of 102, doing the final cut of Piranha II. That's when I thought of Terminator. I guess it was a fever dream."

Over the Garden Wall
Chapter 5 of the miniseries Over the Garden Wall (2014), "Mad Love", was inspired by a dream that show creator Patrick McHale had. In the events of the dream, Pat was house hunting and came across a secret library in one of the houses. As he explored further, he realized that he had entered someone else's home. In the episode, the character Quincy Endicott explores his mansion, and discovers that he has entered the mansion of his neighbor.

Video games

Deltarune
In an interview conducted a few months after the release of its first chapter, Toby Fox stated that the idea for Deltarune (2018) came from a dream he experienced while bedridden from a fever seven years prior. According to Fox, the dream depicted the emotionally-moving ending to a game that didn't exist; upon waking up, he was determined to make the game into a reality.

Science

Descartes' new science
Descartes claimed that the dreams that he had on November 10, 1619, revealed to him the basis of a new philosophy, the scientific method.

The sewing machine

There is a possibly apocryphal account of Elias Howe inventing the needle of the modern lockstitch sewing machine in a dream. A traditional needle has its eye at its base, but Howe was supposedly inspired by a dream to instead position the eye at the point, as recorded in the history of his mother's family:

Benzene

The scientist Friedrich August Kekulé discovered the seemingly impossible chemical structure of benzene (C6H6) when he had a dream of a group of snakes swallowing their tails.

Mendeleev's Periodic Table 
Dmitri Mendeleev, who created the periodic table foundational to current understanding of chemistry, claimed to have envisioned the complete arrangement of the elements in a dream. While struggling to correctly orient the elements he recalls seeing them in a dream a table where all elements fell into place as required. Awakening, he immediately wrote them down on a piece of paper. Only in one place did a correction later seem necessary.

Niels Bohr's structure of the atom 
Niels Bohr won the Nobel Prize for Physics in 1922 for his discovery of the structure of the atom. He recalled that the electrons revolving around the nucleus, like the solar system, came to him in a dream. Upon testing his "dream" hypothesis, he was able to discover that the atomic structure was, in fact, similar to it.

Srinivasa Ramanujan's divine revelations 
Indian mathematician Srinivasa Ramanujan, known for his substantial contributions to number theory, analysis and other areas of pure mathematics, claimed that Hindu goddess Namagiri Thayar would bestow him with mathematical insights in his dreams and that in these visions, "scrolls containing the most complicated mathematics used to unfold before his eyes"

Otto Loewi and neurotransmission
Before Otto Loewi's work, there was debate on whether neurotransmission was primarily chemical or electrical. On a night before Easter Sunday, Loewi had dreamed of the perfect experimental setup: two chambers with beating hearts - one with its nerves intact and the other without. These chambers would be filled with solution and connected with a tube. The experimenter would electrically stimulate the first heart, causing it to beat slower. If neurotransmission was primarily electrical, there would be no reason for the second heart to slow down. However, if neurotransmission was chemical, then the chemicals could theoretically float down the tube and slow down the second heart in the other chamber as well.

Loewi wrote this idea down but could not decipher his own writing when he awoke in the morning. The next night, the dream came to him again. Working with Henry Dale, Loewi would go on to use this experimental setup to demonstrate chemical neurotransmission and win the Nobel Prize for it in 1936.

Food

King's Hand

King's Hand is a dessert made of M&M's and cookie dough, molded into the shape of a hollow hand and filled with Greek salad. It was invented by a 28-year-old data analyst, who says the idea for the dish came to him in a dream in which it was the main course of a festival feast. After a week of experimentation, he posted a series of photos on Twitter on December 6, 2020. Later that day, he shared his recipe. As of December 15, 2020, the tweet had garnered over 166,000 likes and was featured in a diverse array of media and print publications, including Fox News, TODAY, and BuzzFeed News. The original post inspired people to make their own versions, as well as descriptions of foods that had appeared in others' dreams.

See also
 Tetris effect

References

External links
 On Divination in Sleep
 The Dreams of Descartes: Notes on the Origins of Scientific Thinking

Dream
Dreams